Olearia phlogopappa commonly known as the dusty daisy-bush or alpine daisy-bush is a species of flowering plant in the family Asteraceae that is commonly found  in eastern New South Wales, Victoria and Tasmania. It is a small shrub with greyish-green foliage, daisy-like flowers in white, pink or mauve that can be seen from spring to late summer.

Description
The upper leaf surface is a dull grey-green, smooth or with fine minute star-shaped hairs. The underside has a whitish or yellowish appearance. The leaf margins vary, they may be slightly scalloped, toothed or evenly spaced slanting serrations.

Dusty daisy-bush has varying colours with the most common being white but can be blue or pink. The 4-5 bracts are bell-shaped to hemispherical, arranged in rows covered with short soft hairs, occasionally glandular. There are usually 10-14 ray florets on an individual "daisy" flowers and bloom in spring and early summer.

Taxonomy and naming
Olearia phlogopappa was first formally described by Jacques Labillardière in 1806 and published in Novae Hollandiae Plantarum Specimen and 
named Aster phlogopappus. The specific epithet (phlogopappa) is derived from the Ancient Greek words phlogos  meaning "flame" and pappos meaning "pappus", referring to the flame-coloured  ring of hairs above the ovary cited in the original description (pappo flammeo).

Subspecies
There are nine subspecies which are currently recognised by the Australian Plant Census:
Olearia phlogopappa subsp. angustifolia (Hook.f.) Messina 
Olearia phlogopappa subsp. continentalis (Hook.f.) Flowers from October to December. 
Olearia phlogopappa subsp. flavescens (Hutch.) Leaf margins are entire or slightly lobed. The leaf topside is green or a dull green with star shaped hairs, on occasion with glands. Flowers from December to February. 
Olearia phlogopappa subsp. gunniana  Messina 
Olearia phlogopappa subsp. insularis (Labill.) The upper side of leaves are yellowish-green or grey-green with slightly scalloped or rounded margins and a few star-shaped hairs. The underside of leaves are white, cream or grey and thickly covered in star-shaped hairs, sometimes glandular. Flowers appear from October to December.
Olearia phlogopappa subsp. phlogopappa (Labill.) Smaller branches are white to greyish and underside of leaves has a thick covering of small star-shaped hairs. The grey-green leaves are narrowly egg-shaped with toothed edges and a rounded apex. Flowering occurs from September to January.
The green upper leaf surface has numerous to sparsely dispersed star shaped glandular hairs. The leaf underside is cream or white with either several or thickly matted star-shaped hairs with a varying number of glands and a smooth margin. Subspecies salicina is differentiated from other species by its obscure secondary veins and the dense covering of glands on leaves that have an unpleasant aroma when crushed. Flowers are usually in a loose clusters at the end of branchlets. Flowers from October to December.
The topside of the leaves is yellowish-green or green becoming smooth as they age. The underside of the leaf when young may be yellowish but generally white, cream or grey. The flowers are single or in a cluster of 2-3 flowers at the end of branches. Flowers from November to January. 
Olearia phlogopappa subsp. subrepanda (Hook.f) Messina

Distribution and habitat
Olearia phlogopappa is wide spread and common from coast to mountains, found in both dry and wet sclerophyll forests. Found in eastern New South Wales, Victoria, and Tasmania.

The genus Olearia is found in Australia, New Zealand and New Guinea and has about 130 species native to Australia.
Subspecies continentalis grows in scattered locations in NSW and is common in Victoria, growing in moist to wet forest. 
Subspecies flavescens  is found in NSW, widespread in Victoria in alpine and subalpine locations. Growing in heath, scrubland and rocky areas. 
Subspecies insularis grows in Victoria and Tasmania. Usually found growing in coastal heath, deep sand or sand dunes.
Subspecies phlogopappa grows in Victoria in moist to wet situations with good drainage.
Subspecies salicina restricted location in Victoria and Tasmania growing mostly in either wet forests to dry woodland.
Subspecies serrata is found in Victoria and NSW with restricted distribution. Grows on slopes and close to headwaters in open heath near Eucalypt woodlands.

Cultivation
The species withstands moderate frost and drought, but prefers moist conditions and a well-drained soil in a sunny position, flowering reduced with part shaded positions. Pruning is required to stop plants becoming spindly. Propagate from seed or tip cuttings.

Cultivars
A number of cultivars are commercially available including:
'Comber's Blue' 
'Comber's Mauve'
'Comber's Pink' 
'Exbury White' 
 pink-flowered
'Rosea'
'Sawtooth'
'Splendens Group' 
'Tournaig Titch'

References

Asterales of Australia
Flora of New South Wales
Flora of Tasmania
Flora of Victoria (Australia)
phlogopappa
Plants described in 1806
Taxa named by Augustin Pyramus de Candolle